The Bensen B-12, variously dubbed the Sky-Way or Sky-Mat was an unconventional multirotor developed by Igor Bensen in the United States in the late 1950s. Extremely unorthodox, the design sprang from Bensen's thinking about the engine redundancy necessary to ensure the safe operation of small, personal rotorcraft operating at low altitudes and slow speeds. The result was a broad aluminum framework supporting an array of ten engines and rotors that Bensen likened to a "magic carpet". The design was later refined to include eight rotors, each driven by two engines for a total of sixteen.

Successfully flown in 1961 at altitudes up to 20 ft (6 m), Bensen felt that the approach had potential for military heavy-lift or agricultural applications, but nothing further came of it.

Specifications

References

 
 
 aerofiles.com
 Bensen Aircraft Foundation 

1960s United States experimental aircraft
1960s United States helicopters
B-12
Multirotor helicopters
Aircraft first flown in 1961
Ten-engined aircraft